Les Deschiens is a French-language comedy television series. It was broadcast from 1993 to 2002 on Canal + (France).

Plot 
This semi-improvised series of short sketches depicts a gallery of quirky characters having arguments or selling bizarre products.

Casting
 François Morel : M. Morel
 Yolande Moreau : Yolande
 Olivier Saladin : M. Saladin
 Philippe Duquesne : M. Duquesne
 Bruno Lochet : Bruno  
 Lorella Cravotta : Lorella 
 Olivier Broche : The son
 Atmen Kelif : Atmen
 Jean-Marc Bihour : Jean-Marc
 Michel Robin
 Fabienne Chaudat
 Jean-François Dinacaroupin
 François Toumarkine
 Robert Horn
 Yves Robin
 Hervé Lassince

References

External links

1993 French television series debuts